NOW! was a British weekly news magazine founded by entrepreneur Sir James Goldsmith, partly as a vehicle for dissemination of his right-wing political opinions. The magazine was headquartered in London.

History and profile
NOW! was established in  1979, taking advantage of the market opportunity created by the closure of The Times and The Sunday Times during a labour dispute. This first issue was dated 14–20 September 1979, ran to 142 pages and was priced at 50p. Despite good sales for the first issue, NOW! misjudged the market and the competition from Sunday newspapers and the news magazines The Economist, Time and Newsweek. It never met circulation targets and incurred heavy losses. After 84 issues, Goldsmith closed it in early May 1981.

Issue one featured on the cover a grainy black-and-white photograph of Brigadier Khalil al-Azzawi, director of Iraqi Military Intelligence with the banner "Exclusive: How this man's agents spy on Britain..." and a tag for a "Special NOW! Enquiry" on "What the Young Generation really thinks".  Its editor was Anthony Shrimsley, Marketing Director (ex-Daily Mirror) Derek Rogers, and senior staff and contributors included, Frank Johnson, Clive Barnes, Art Buchwald and Patrick Hutber.

References

1979 establishments in the United Kingdom
1981 disestablishments in the United Kingdom
Defunct magazines published in the United Kingdom
Magazines established in 1979
Magazines disestablished in 1981
Magazines published in London
News magazines published in the United Kingdom
Right-wing politics in the United Kingdom
Weekly magazines published in the United Kingdom